Epacris mucronulata is a species of flowering plant in the heath family Ericaceae and is endemic to Tasmania. It is an erect shrub with softly-hairy young branches, lance-shaped leaves, and cylindrical white flowers in small groups at the ends of the branches.

Description
The petals are white, joined at the base to form a cylindrical tube, the style and anthers enclosed inside the petal tube.

Taxonomy and naming
Epacris mucronulata was first formally described in 1810 by Robert  in his Prodromus Florae Novae Hollandiae et Insulae Van Diemen. The specific epithet (mucronulata) means "having a small sharp point".

Distribution and habitat
This epacris grows near rivers, especially in rainforest and is found in the south-west of Tasmania, including near the Huon and Gordon Rivers.

References

mucronulata
Ericales of Australia
Flora of Tasmania
Plants described in 1810
Endemic flora of Australia
Taxa named by Robert Brown (botanist, born 1773)